Rainier III (Rainier Louis Henri Maxence Bertrand Grimaldi; 31 May 1923 – 6 April 2005) was Prince of Monaco from 1949 to his death in 2005. Rainier ruled the Principality of Monaco for almost 56 years.

Rainier was born at the Prince's Palace of Monaco, the only son of Prince Pierre and Hereditary Princess Charlotte of Monaco. He was crucially responsible for the transformation of Monaco's economy, shifting from its traditional casino gambling base to its current status as a tax haven and cultural destination. The Prince also coordinated the substantial reforms of Monaco's constitution, which limited the powers of sovereign rule.

Rainier married American film star Grace Kelly in 1956, which generated global media attention. They had three children: Caroline, Albert and Stéphanie. He died in April 2005 from complications relating to a lung infection as a result of frequent smoking; he was succeeded by his son, Albert II.

Early life
Rainier was born at Prince's Palace in Monaco, the first native-born prince since Honoré IV in 1758. Rainier's mother, Charlotte was the only child of Louis II, Prince of Monaco, and his lover, Marie Juliette Louvet; she was legitimised through formal adoption and subsequently named heiress presumptive to the throne of Monaco. Rainier's father, Count Pierre of Polignac was half-French and half-Mexican, who adopted his wife's dynasty, Grimaldi, upon marriage, and was made a Prince of Monaco by his father-in-law. Rainier had an older sister, Princess Antoinette, Baroness of Massy. His parents divorced in 1933.

Rainier's early education was conducted in England, at the public schools of Summerfields in St Leonards-on-Sea, Sussex, and after 1935 at Stowe School, in Buckinghamshire.  Rainier then attended the Institut Le Rosey in Rolle and Gstaad, Switzerland from 1939, before continuing to the University of Montpellier in France, where he obtained a Bachelor of Arts degree in 1943, before studying at the Institut d'études politiques de Paris in Paris.

In 1944, the day before his 21st birthday, Rainier's mother renounced her right to the Monegasque throne and Rainier became Prince Louis's direct heir. In World War II, Rainier joined the Free French Army in September 1944, and served under General de Monsabert as a second lieutenant. As soldier, he witnessed action during the German counter-offensive in Alsace. Rainier received the French Croix de Guerre with bronze star (representing a brigade level citation) and was given the rank of Legion of Honor in 1947. Following his decommission from the French Army, he was promoted by the French government as a Captain in April 1949 and a Colonel in December 1954.

Rainier became the Sovereign Prince of Monaco upon the death of his grandfather, Prince Louis II, on 9 May 1949, at the age of 25.

Reign

After ascending the throne, Rainier III worked to recoup Monaco's lustre, which had become tarnished through financial neglect and scandal (his mother, Princess Charlotte, took a noted jewel thief known as René the Cane as her lover). Upon ascension, the Prince found a treasury that was practically empty. Monaco's traditional gambling clientele, largely European aristocrats, found themselves with reduced funds after World War II. Other successful gambling centres had opened to compete with Monaco. To compensate for the loss of income, Rainier decided to promote Monaco as a tax haven, commercial centre, real-estate development opportunity, and international tourist attraction. The early years of his reign saw the overweening involvement of the Greek shipping tycoon Aristotle Onassis, who took control of the Société des Bains de Mer and envisioned Monaco as solely a gambling resort. Prince Rainier regained control of SBM in 1964, effectively ensuring that his vision of Monaco would be implemented.

During his reign, the Societé Monégasque de Banques et de Métaux Précieux, a bank which held a significant amount of Monaco's capital, was bankrupted by its investments in a media company in 1955, leading to the resignation of Monaco's cabinet. In 1962, Rainier ratified the Principality's new constitution, which significantly reduced the power of the sovereign. He had suspended the previous constitution in 1959, saying that it "has hindered the administrative and political life of the country". The changes ended autocratic rule, placing power with both the Prince and a National Council of eighteen elected members.

At the time of his death, he was the world's second longest-serving living head of state, just below the King of Thailand, Bhumibol Adulyadej.

Personal life
In the 1940s and 1950s, Rainier had a ten-year relationship with the French film actress Gisèle Pascal, whom he had met while a student at Montpellier University, and the couple lived at Saint-Jean-Cap-Ferrat. Rainier's sister, Princess Antoinette, wishing her own son to ascend the throne, spread rumors that Pascal was infertile. The rumours combined with a snobbery over Pascal's family origins ultimately ended the relationship.

Rainier established a postal museum in 1950: the Museum of Stamps and Coins, in Monaco's Fontvieille district by using the collections of the Monegasque princes Albert I and Louis II. The prestigious philatelic collectors organization, Club de Monte-Carlo de l'Élite de la Philatélie, was established in 1999 under his direct patronage.  The club is headquartered at the postal museum, and its membership restricted to institutions and one hundred prestigious collectors. Rainier organized exhibitions of rare and exceptional postage stamps and letters with the club's members. 

Throughout his reign, Rainier surveyed all the process of creation of Monaco stamps. He preferred stamps printed in intaglio and the art of engravers Henri Cheffer and Czesław Słania.

Rainier's car collection was opened to the public as the Monaco Top Cars Collection in Fontvieille.

Marriage and family

The Prince met Academy Award-winning actress Grace Kelly in 1955, during a photocall at the Palace scheduled to support her trip to the Cannes Film Festival. After a year-long courtship described as containing "a good deal of rational appraisal on both sides," Prince Rainier married Kelly in 1956. 

The union was met with mass attention from the public, and was described as the "wedding of the century" and the "world's most anticipated wedding" by the media. The civil ceremony took place at the Palace on 18 April, with the religious wedding being held on 19 April at the Saint Nicholas Cathedral. Rainier wore a military dress of his own design, based on the uniforms of Napoleon Bonaparte. Presided over by Bishop Gilles Barthe, the marriage was broadcast by MGM Studios, and viewed by over 30 million people across the globe. The couple honeymooned in the Mediterranean on their yacht, Deo Juvante II.

Princess Grace gave birth to their first child, Princess Caroline, on 23 January 1957. Their second child and heir, Prince Albert, was born on 14 March 1958. Their youngest, Princess Stéphanie, was born 1 February 1965, with all children having been delivered at the Palace.

In 1979, the Prince made his acting debut alongside the Princess in a half-hour independent film, Rearranged, produced in Monaco. After its premiere in Monaco, Princess Grace showed it to ABC TV executives in New York in 1982, who expressed interest if extra scenes were shot. However, Grace died in a car crash caused by a stroke in 1982, making it impossible to expand the film for American release. After Grace's death, Rainier refused to remarry. He established the Princess Grace Foundation-USA in 1982 in her honor, to support fledging American artists.

Illness and death

Prince Rainier smoked 60 cigarettes a day. In the last years of his life his health progressively declined. He underwent surgery in late 1999 and 2000, and was hospitalized in November 2002 for a chest infection. He spent three weeks in hospital in January 2004 for what was described as general fatigue. In February 2004, he was hospitalized with a coronary lesion and a damaged blood vessel. In October he was again in hospital with a lung infection. In November of that year, Prince Albert appeared on CNN's Larry King Live and told Larry King that his father was fine, though he was suffering from bronchitis.

On 7 March 2005, he was again hospitalized with a lung infection. Rainier was moved to the hospital's intensive care unit on 22 March. One day later, on 23 March, it was announced he was on a ventilator, suffering from renal and heart failure. On 26 March, the palace reported that despite intensive ongoing efforts to improve the prince's health, he was continuing to deteriorate; however, the following day, he was reported to be conscious, his heart and kidney conditions having stabilized. His prognosis remained "very reserved".

On 31 March 2005, following consultation with the Crown Council of Monaco, the Palais Princier announced that Rainier's son, Hereditary Prince Albert, would take over the duties of his father as regent since Rainier was no longer able to exercise his princely functions.

On 1 April 2005, the Palace announced that Rainier's doctors believed his chances of recovery were "slim". On 6 April, Prince Rainier III died at the Cardiothoracic Centre of Monaco at 6:35 am local time at the age of 81. He was succeeded by his only son, who became Prince Albert II. He was buried on 15 April 2005 beside his wife, Princess Grace, at the Cathedral of Our Lady Immaculate, the traditional burial place of princes and princesses of Monaco, and the place where Prince Rainier and Princess Grace had been married in 1956. Because his death occurred shortly after that of Pope John Paul II, Rainier's death was overshadowed in the media.

Honours
 France: Grand Cross of the Order of the Legion of Honour
 Iran Iranian Imperial Family: Recipient of the Commemorative Medal of the 2,500-year Celebration of the Persian Empire
 Italy: Grand Cross with Collar of the Order of Merit of the Italian Republic
 Sovereign Military Order of Malta: Knight Grand Cross with Collar of the Order of Merit
 Portugal: Grand Cross with Collar of the Military Order of Saint James of the Sword
 Republic of San Marino: Grand Cross of the Equestrian Order of Saint-Marin

Awards
 IOC International Olympic Committee: Recipient of the Gold Olympic Order

Arms and emblems

Ancestry

See also 
 Prince Rainier Day

References

External links

Prince's Palace, Monaco, official website
Cardinal Ratzinger sends condolences to Monaco on Prince Rainier's death
The Monte Carlo Royal Palace – 360 degree QTVR
Prince Rainier III of Monaco – Daily Telegraph obituary

|-

|-

1923 births
2005 deaths
20th-century Princes of Monaco
21st-century Princes of Monaco
Sciences Po alumni
Burials at the Cathedral of Our Lady Immaculate
Hereditary Princes of Monaco
Deaths from kidney failure
Marquesses of Baux
House of Grimaldi
International Olympic Committee members
Monegasque Roman Catholics
People educated at Stowe School
Monegasque philatelists
Princes of Monaco
Alumni of Institut Le Rosey
Monegasque princes

Grand Masters of the Order of Saint-Charles
Recipients of the Order of Saint-Charles
Grand Crosses of the Order of Saint-Charles
Recipients of the Order of Grimaldi
Knights Grand Cross of the Order of Grimaldi
Commanders of the Order of Cultural Merit (Monaco)
Recipients of the Croix de Guerre 1939–1945 (France)
Grand Croix of the Légion d'honneur
Knights Grand Cross with Collar of the Order of Merit of the Italian Republic
Grand Crosses of the Order of George I
Grand Crosses of the Order of José Matías Delgado
Recipients of the Croix de guerre (Belgium)

Recipients of the Olympic Order
Monegasque people of Italian descent
Philately of Monaco
Polignac family
Monegasque people of Mexican descent
Monegasque people of English descent
Monegasque people of Scottish descent
Monegasque people of German descent
Free French military personnel of World War II
Dukes of Mayenne
Dukes of Valentinois